Antioch is an unincorporated community in Cherokee County, Alabama.

References 

Unincorporated communities in Cherokee County, Alabama
Unincorporated communities in Alabama